Tritik stitching is a small running line of stitching that is gathered tightly. It is often used in African textiles and the designs are much bolder than in most other forms of stitching. This type of stitching is mostly found in Africa. It also played an important role in tie-dyeing.
It is a colour resistance technique.

Sewing